Hearts and Minds was a public relations campaign used in the Iraq War (2003-2011).

Background

The operation to "win Iraqi hearts and minds", had been established before the war started. One Central Command planner noted that psychological operations (PSYOPs) were slated to play "a crucial role ... to any conflict in Iraq and to the war on terrorism". Senior US military leaders placed such an importance on the operation that they reworked the way in which the related PSYOPs were carried out, often citing the failures during Operation Enduring Freedom, where it took as long as two days to get PSYOPs through the approval process.

2004 Congressional hearing

On June 15, 2004,  Christopher Shays (R-CT), Chairman of the Subcommittee on National Security, Emerging Threats, and International Relations held hearings which had the aim of determining "corrective actions that might be undertaken to regain the confidence and cooperation (hearts and minds) of the Iraqi people, improve public diplomacy messages, and help chart the course for future efforts in Iraq." Shays noted, "The United States and its Coalition partners are attempting to win the hearts and minds of the people in Iraq while providing military security and support to economic and political reform programs. But some assumptions made about Iraq proved faulty, and some policy decisions were controversial and created more doubt than confidence in U.S. capabilities and intentions."

The hearing focused upon two main questions: 1. What policy decisions made by the Coalition Provisional Authority contributed to changes in Iraqi confidence and cooperation? and, 2. What steps does the United States need to take to regain the confidence and cooperation of the Iraqi people?

See also
Winning hearts and minds
"Hearts and Minds" in the Vietnam War
Shock and awe

References

Further reading

John Tierney, "Iraqi Family Ties Complicate American Efforts for Change," New York Times, September 27, 2003. 
Amatzia Baram, "The Iraqi Tribes and the Post-Saddam System," The Brookings Institution Iraq Memo #18, July 8, 2003. 
Paul Wolfowitz, "The Road Map For A Sovereign Iraq," Wall Street Journal, June 9, 2004.
Steve Tatham, Royal Naval Spokesman Iraq, "Losing Arab Hearts & Minds; The Coalition, Al-Jazeera and Muslim Public opinion" Hurst&Co London 2006.

Public relations
Iraq War
United States propaganda in Iraq